("double-mercenaries", "double-pay men", from German doppel- meaning double, Sold meaning pay) were Landsknechte in 16th-century Germany who volunteered to fight in the front line, taking on extra risk, in exchange for double payment. The  of each company were usually issued with ranged weapons, such as a crossbow or an arquebus, and arranged in the wings of a square, in front of the pikemen.

The fencing guild of the Brotherhood of Saint Mark had the monopoly on the use of the  after Frederick III, Holy Roman Emperor granted it to them in 1487.

The veracity of this tradition is disputed, but at least as a legend, it appears to date to at least the 17th century.

See also
 Duplicarius

References

Further reading
 Douglas Miller, John Richards: Landsknechte. 1486–1560. Siegler, Sankt Augustin 2004, .
 Thomas Arnold: The Renaissance at War. Cassell, London 2002, .
 Sebastian Franck: Chronica des gantzen Teutschen lands, aller Teütschen völcker herkom(m)en, Namen, Händeln, Guten vn(n) (unn) bösen Thaten [...]. Apiario, Bern 1539. (auch Germaniae chronicon. 1538)

Landsknechts